Storyteller is the fifth studio album recorded by American singer and songwriter Carrie Underwood. It was released on October 23, 2015, by Sony Music Nashville. Following the release and success of her fourth studio album, Blown Away (2012), Underwood began working on Storyteller in early 2014. However, she tentatively suspended most work on the album because of her pregnancy with her first child. In the midterm, Underwood released her first greatest hits record, Greatest Hits: Decade #1, on December 9, 2014, to much success. After the birth of her son, she took some additional time off before going back into the studio in early 2015 to finish working on the album.

Met with mostly positive reviews from music critics, Storyteller became a commercial success and set multiple records upon its release. By debuting at number two on the Billboard 200 chart, it made Underwood the only country artist in history to have all of her first five studio albums debut at number one or two, and with a number one debut on the Top Country Albums chart, it made her the only artist to score six consecutive number one albums on the chart. Storyteller also performed well internationally upon its release, including a number four debut in Australia, number three in Canada and thirteen in the United Kingdom. As of October 2016, the album has been certified Platinum by the RIAA. It marks Underwood's sixth consecutive album to go either Platinum or multi-Platinum.

The album produced two consecutive Billboard Country Airplay chart number-one singles in "Heartbeat" and "Church Bells", along with the number-two singles, "Smoke Break" and "Dirty Laundry." "Smoke Break", "Heartbeat" and "Dirty Laundry" also topped the Billboard Canada Country chart.  All four singles received multi-Platinum or Platinum certifications.

Storyteller was Underwood's last album under Arista Nashville and Sony Music Group, following her new deal with Universal Music Group's Capitol Nashville.

Background
After the release and success of her fourth studio album, Blown Away, in 2012 and its international supporting tour, Blown Away Tour (2012-2013), Underwood confirmed, in August 2013, that she had begun planning on a new album and would start working on it in 2014. However, she released her first greatest hits album in late 2014 to much success, while pregnant with her first child. After giving birth, in February 2015, Underwood went back into the studio to finish working on the album. On August 20, 2015, Underwood announced the album's title and release date via live Facebook stream.

Underwood has described Storyteller as being more laid-back and more twangy as opposed to her last studio album, Blown Away (2012). For this album, Underwood worked with frequent collaborators such as Hillary Lindsey, Ashley Gorley, Chris DeStefano, David Hodges, Brett James, and Mark Bright, although Underwood also worked with new collaborators such as Liz Rose, Zach Crowell, and Jay Joyce. Joyce produced the album's lead single "Smoke Break", which Underwood wrote with DeStefano and Lindsey.

Promotion
Underwood revealed the album's track listing on September 9, 2015, via her Instagram account. On September 10, 2015, Underwood appeared on The Tonight Show Starring Jimmy Fallon and also performed "Smoke Break". On September 21, 2015, Underwood performed the song at the Apple Music Festival in London.

On October 9, 2015, "Heartbeat" was released as a promotional single from the album. The song features background vocals by country artist Sam Hunt . It sold 23,000 copies and debuted at number 26 on Hot Country Songs chart for the week ending October 31, 2015. As of October 26, 2015 the song has sold 31,000 copies. The song also entered the Scottish Singles Chart at number 80.

"Renegade Runaway" was released as the second promotional single on October 16, 2015. It sold 13,000 copies and debuted at number 34 on Hot Country Songs chart. A third and final promotional single, "What I Never Knew I Always Wanted" was released October 19, 2015. It sold 9,000 copies and entered the Hot Country Songs chart at number 38 and reached number 32. As of November 21, 2015, it sold 21,000 copies. All three singles were made available for download on iTunes, Amazon, and other digital retailers with a pre-order of the full Storyteller album.

In support of the album, Underwood returned to headline the C2C: Country to Country festival for the first time since 2013, making her the first artist to headline the festival twice. She performed concerts in London, Dublin, Glasgow, Oslo and Stockholm.

Singles
"Smoke Break", the lead single off Storyteller, was released on August 21, 2015. The song set an all-time record for the largest first-week radio adds in the history of Country Aircheck, with 145 Mediabase adds and 159 total Billboard and Country Aircheck reporting stations lined up for the song's official airplay impact date. It reached number four on the Hot Country Songs chart and number two on the Country Airplay chart.

"Heartbeat" was released as the second single from Storyteller at the 2015 American Music Awards. The song made its official impact on country radio on November 30, 2015. It has reached number two on the Hot Country Songs chart and number one on the Country Airplay chart, becoming her 14th leader on the chart, widening her record for the most number-one's among women in the history of the chart.

"Chaser" was released as a single exclusively to UK radio stations on April 1, 2016. It marked Underwood's first limited release to European stations.

"Church Bells" is the third single from "Storyteller"  in the US, and was released to country radio on April 11, 2016. It has reached number two on the Hot Country Songs chart and number one on the Country Airplay chart, becoming Underwood's 15th number one on that chart. The song was nominated for Best Country Solo Performance at the 59th Grammy Awards.

On August 12, 2016, it was confirmed that "Dirty Laundry" would be serviced as the fourth single in the United States and Canada, and was released to country radio on September 5, 2016. It peaked at number two on Country Airplay chart and number three on Hot Country Songs chart.

Tour
Underwood began the Storyteller Tour: Stories in the Round on January 30, 2016, in Jacksonville, Florida to support the album. The first leg of the tour was completed by May 31, 2016. On July 21, 2016, Billboard published their mid-year touring update for the highest-grossing tours between November 10, 2015, and June 6, 2016, and Storyteller Tour was ranked the tenth highest-grossing tour for that period with a total gross of $29,993,822  and total attendance of 449,396.

The tour was concluded on November 28, 2016. It has grossed $51,204,491 and had played to a million fans.

Critical reception

Storyteller received generally positive reviews from critics. On Metacritic, which assigns a normalized rating out of 100 to reviews from mainstream publications, the album has an average score of 74, based on nine reviews. It is the highest Metascore for any of Underwoods' albums.

Stephen Thomas Erlewine of AllMusic said the record "demands attention and it deserves it, too", while The Boston Globes Sarah Rodman called it Underwood's best album yet. Jewly Hight from Billboard wrote, "Unlike newer country acts who can sound like they’re merely co-starring with their own faddish production, Underwood commands the spotlight, balancing the well-established extremes of her on-stage persona -- Midwestern girl-next-door and imperious diva -- within these freshened-up aesthetic frames." Robert Christgau wrote in Vice that the record has more "good tales" on it than Underwood's Greatest Hits album. "She still oversings sometimes, as idols will", he said, "but finally she's relaxed enough to let the songs narrate for themselves—be they torch-carrying and fuck-you songs, bad girl and justifiable homicide songs, or tonight's-the-night and happily-ever-after songs."

New York Times critic Jon Caramanica was less impressed, finding much of the songwriting devoid of "bite or pulp" while accusing Underwood of singing bombastically throughout the album. "She largely picks songs that serve as launch platforms for her ballistic-missile voice," he wrote, "but they don’t cohere into a whole identity." In Exclaim!, Stuart Henderson wrote that the record is "more than halfway boring," explaining that "it isn't uninspired or weakly performed. Rather, it is boring in spite of the overwhelming bombast, the booming bass and pounding drums, the huge vocals, the wailing guitars; it is boring because rather than electrifying you, it distances and anaesthetizes."

Accolades
The album received a nomination for Album of the Year for the 50th annual Country Music Association Awards. It  won Favorite Album - Country at the 2016 American Music Awards, Underwood's fifth album to do so.

Commercial performance
In the United States, Storyteller debuted at number two on the Billboard 200 with 177,000 album-equivalent units; the album sold 164,000 copies in pure sales, with the remainder of its unit total reflecting the album's streaming and track equivalent album units. This made Underwood the only country artist to have his or her first five studio albums debut at number one or number two on the Billboard 200 chart. In addition, the album debuted at number one on the Top Country Albums chart, earning Underwood another record as the only artist to score six consecutive number one albums on that chart. It held the number two position on the Billboard 200 in its second week, moving another 81,000 units, including over 73,000 album copies sold. On the chart dated December 19, it rose back to number one on the Top Country Albums for a second week. It was certified Gold by the RIAA on December 4, 2015, for shipments of over 500,000 copies in the US. In October 2016, the album was certified Platinum, one year after its release, becoming the sixth album by Underwood to receive a Platinum certification. As of April 2017, the album has sold 752,100 copies in the US.

Outside of the United States, the album debuted at number three in Canada, number four in Australia, number six in Scotland, number thirteen on the UK Albums Chart—becoming her second top twenty album in the region—and charted in another six regions.

Track listing

Personnel 
Credits adapted from AllMusic.

Performers
 Carrie Underwood – lead vocals (1-13), backing vocals (3, 10, 12, 13)
 Hillary Lindsey – backing vocals (1, 2, 5, 7, 8, 10–13)
 Perry Coleman – backing vocals (3, 10, 11, 12)
 Zach Crowell – backing vocals (4, 9)
 Sam Hunt – backing vocals (4)
 Chris DeStefano – backing vocals (5, 7)
 The McCrary Sisters – backing vocals (6)
 Jerry Flowers – backing vocals (9)
 James Moore – backing vocals (12)

Musicians

 John Deaderick – keyboards (1, 2, 5–8)
 Jay Joyce – keyboards (1, 2, 8), synth pad (1, 2, 5, 7, 8), programming (1, 2, 5, 7, 8), electric guitar (1, 2, 5–8), bass (5, 7)
 Charlie Judge – synthesizers (3, 10, 12, 13), programming (3, 10, 13), accordion (11)
 Jimmy Nichols – acoustic piano (3, 10–13)
 Zach Crowell – keyboards (4, 9), acoustic piano (4), programming (4, 9), guitar (4)
 Tom Bukovac – electric guitar (1, 2, 8, 12)
 Bryan Sutton – acoustic guitar (1, 2, 8)
 Kenny Greenberg – electric guitar (3, 10–13)
 Ilya Toshinsky – acoustic guitar (3, 10–13), mandolin (11)
 Devin Malone – electric guitar (4, 9), pedal steel guitar (4), cello (4)
 Pat McGrath – acoustic guitar (4, 9), banjo (4), mandolin (9)
 Derek Wells – electric guitar (4, 9)
 Adam Ollendorff – dobro (4)
 Forest Glen Whitehead – acoustic guitar (5, 7)
 Rob McNelley – electric guitar (6)
 Jerry Flowers – bass (1, 2, 8)
 Michael Rhodes – bass (3, 12, 13)
 Jimmie Lee Sloas – bass (4, 9, 10, 11)
 Dave Roe – bass (5, 6, 7)
 Fred Eltringham – drums (1, 2, 5–8), percussion (1, 2, 5–8)
 Chris McHugh – drums (3, 4, 9–13)
 Eric Darken – percussion (3, 10–13)
 Travis Meadows – harmonica (6)

Production and design

 Producers – Jay Joyce (Tracks 1, 2 & 5–8); Mark Bright (Tracks 3 & 10–13); Zach Crowell (Tracks 4 & 9).
 Production Assistant (Tracks 1, 2 & 5–8) – Melissa Spillman
 A&R (Tracks 3 & 10–13) – Kristen Wines
 Production Coordination – Mike "Frog" Girffith (Tracks 3 & 10–13); Kenley Flynn (Tracks 4 & 9).
 Engineers – Jason Hall (Tracks 1, 2 & 5–8); Derek Bason (Tracks 3 & 10–13); Nick Autry (Tracks 4 & 9).
 Additional Engineers – Adam Chagnon and Andrew Schubert (Tracks 1, 2 & 4–9); Zach Crowell (Tracks 4 & 9).
 Assistant Engineers – Paul Cossette and Caleb VanBuskirk (Tracks 1, 2 & 5–8); Chris Small (Tracks 3 & 10–13); Kam Luchterland (Tracks 4 & 9).
 Recorded at Starstruck Studios, Sound Stage Studios and The Pizza Kitchen (Nashville, Tennessee).
 Mixing – Chris Lord-Alge (Tracks 1, 2 & 4–9); Derek Bason (Tracks 3 & 10–13)
 Mix Assistants – Keith Armstrong and Nik Karpen (Tracks 1, 2 & 4–9); Chris Small (Tracks 3 & 10–13).
 Tracks 1, 2 & 4-9 mixed at Mix LA (Los Angeles, California).
 Tracks 3 & 10-13 mixed at Starstruck Studios.
 Digital Editing – Derek Bason and Chris Small (Tracks 3 & 10–13); Zach Crowell (Tracks 4 & 9).
 Mastered by Adam Ayan at Gateway Mastering (Portland, Maine).
 Creative Director and Design – Scott McDaniel
 Package Design – Grace Boto
 Photography – Randee St. Nichols
 Liner Notes – Carrie Underwood
 Manager – Ann Edelblute

Other charted songs
Following the release of the album, five of its songs charted on the Hot Country Songs: "The Girl You Think I Am" at number 38 (8,000 copies sold), "Like I'll Never Love You Again" at number 39 (8,000 copies), "Dirty Laundry" at number 47 (3,000 copies), "Relapse" at number 48 (4,000 copies) and "Church Bells" at number 49 (2,300 copies).

Charts

Weekly charts

Year-end charts

Certifications

Release history

References

2015 albums
19 Recordings albums
Albums produced by Mark Bright (record producer)
Albums produced by Jay Joyce
Arista Records albums
Carrie Underwood albums
Arista Nashville albums